Sir James Weir Hogg, 1st Baronet (1790 – 27 May 1876) was an Irish-born businessman, lawyer and politician and Chairman of the East India Company.

Background and education
Hogg was born in Lisburn, County Antrim, Ireland, the eldest son of William Hogg and his wife Mary, née Dickey. He was educated at Dr Bruce's Academy, Belfast, and later at Trinity College Dublin, where he was elected a Scholar. Hogg was the uncle and patron of General John Nicholson.

Legal and political career
He was called to the Bar and proceeded to India in 1814, where he obtained a large and lucrative practice. In 1822 he accepted the appointment of Registrar of the Supreme Court of Judicature, Calcutta, which he held until his return to England in 1833. In 1839 he was elected a Director of the East India Company.

He was elected MP for Beverley in 1834, and represented Honiton from 1847 to 1857, which seat he lost by two votes at the general election that year. He was the founder of a political dynasty which is still represented by his descendent, Viscount Hailsham.

Hogg was twice Chairman of the East India Company, and in 1858 when the government of India was transferred to The Crown he was elected member of the Council of India, until his resignation in 1872, aged eighty two.

He was created a Baronet, of Upper Grosvenor Street in the County of London, in 1846, and was offered the posts of Judge Advocate General (United Kingdom) and the Governorship of Bombay, both of which he refused. Hogg lived at No 4 Carlton Gardens in Mayfair. Hogg had made himself extremely wealthy.

Family
Hogg married on 26 July 1822, Mary, the daughter of Samuel Swinton of Swinton House, Swinton, Berwickshire (see Clan Swinton).

Sir James and Lady Hogg had fourteen children. On his death in 1876, he was succeeded in the baronetcy by his son Sir James Macnaghten Hogg, who, on 5 July 1887, was created Baron Magheramorne, of Magheramorne in the County of Antrim, in the Peerage of the United Kingdom, as part of the celebrations for the Golden Jubilee of Queen Victoria.

Hogg's seventh son Quintin Hogg was a merchant and philanthropist and the father of Douglas Hogg, 1st Viscount Hailsham and Sir Malcolm Hogg, who also served on the Council of India, and grandfather of Quintin Hogg, Baron Hailsham of St Marylebone.

Hogg’s title passed around several branches of his descendants but was ultimately inherited by the branch of his second son Charles Swinton Hogg, whose son Ernest Charles Hogg  married a member of the Peel Family and he was the father to Sir Arthur Ramsay Hogg, 7th Bt.

Hoggs children had largely married into the nobility. His eldest daughter Isabella was the wife of Dudley Coutts Marjoribanks, 1st Baron and was the mother of Edward Marjoribanks, 2nd Baron Tweedmouth of Edington, who married Lady Fanny Octavia Louise Spencer-Churchill, daughter of the 7th Duke of Marlborough and an aunt of Winston Churchill.

Isabella Hogg was also of the mother of Dame Ishbel Hamilton-Gordon, Marchioness of Aberdeen and Temair.

James Weir Hogg died in 1876, aged 85–86.

See also
Hogg Baronets
John Nicholson (East India Company officer)

References

 Obituary, The Times, 29 May 1876; pg. 12; Issue 28641; col E. "The Late Sir James Hogg".

External links
 

1790 births
1876 deaths
Alumni of Trinity College Dublin
Baronets in the Baronetage of the United Kingdom
Conservative Party (UK) MPs for English constituencies
Directors of the British East India Company
James
Irish people of Scottish descent
Members of the Council of India
Members of the Privy Council of the United Kingdom
People from Lisburn
Scholars of Trinity College Dublin
UK MPs 1835–1837
Members of the Parliament of the United Kingdom for Honiton